My Disney Kitchen is a PlayStation and PC video game distributed by Disney Interactive. The PlayStation release was published by Atlus in Japan, while BAM! Entertainment published the North American release. It was released in Japan on February 7, 2002 and in North America on November 5. The game is designed for young children to encourage creativity and improve observation skills. The game contains several cooking appliances and food items, as well as a breakfast station and a cake-making station. The player can decorate the kitchen and change the wallpaper and decorations like the tablecloth.

References

1998 video games
2002 video games
Atlus games
Cooking video games
Disney video games
Mickey Mouse video games
PlayStation (console) games
Video games developed in Japan
Windows games
Children's educational video games
Single-player video games